Davit Imedashvili (born 15 December 1984) is a former Georgian footballer.

External links
 

Footballers from Georgia (country)
Association football defenders
Expatriate footballers from Georgia (country)
Expatriate footballers in Ukraine
Expatriate sportspeople from Georgia (country) in Ukraine
Expatriate footballers in Latvia
Expatriate footballers in Hungary
Georgia (country) international footballers
FC WIT Georgia players
FC Dynamo Kyiv players
FK Ventspils players
Nyíregyháza Spartacus FC players
Ukrainian Premier League players
1984 births
Living people
Expatriate sportspeople from Georgia (country) in Latvia
People from Rustavi
Expatriate sportspeople from Georgia (country) in Azerbaijan
Expatriate sportspeople from Georgia (country) in Hungary
Erovnuli Liga players